Chamgordan (also Romanized as Chamgordān, Chamgordān, Cham-e Gordān, and Cham Gordān; also known as Cham-e Gordūn) is a city in the Central District of Lenjan County, Isfahan Province, Iran. At the 2006 census, its population was 16,086, in 4,252 families.

References

Populated places in Lenjan County

Cities in Isfahan Province